Epilobium cleistogamum is a species of willowherb known by the common name selfing willowherb. This plant is endemic to central California where it is a resident of vernal pools and mudflats. It is a small annual plant with fuzzy pointed green leaves. Some of the leaves have hairs which are knobby and gland-tipped. The flowers are usually cleistogamous, that is, they self-pollinate without opening. Some of the flowers do open to reveal pinkish-purple to nearly white, deeply notched petals. The fruit is a tough four-sided capsule about a centimeter long.

References

External links
Jepson Manual Treatment
Photo gallery

cleistogamum
Flora of California
Flora without expected TNC conservation status